The I Feel Good Tour was a concert tour by Pitbull. This is the sixth tour Pitbull has done, following his 2017 joint tour with Enrique Iglesias titled "Enrique Iglesias and Pitbull Live!. Australian rapper Iggy Azalea was announced as the opening act for the tour.

The duo played shows in 32 cities in the United States. It placed 25th on Pollstar's annual "Top 200 North American Tours", and 26th worldwide earning $20.3 million with 424,545 tickets sold.

Critical reception 
Claude Sawyer from 315 Music stated "The man never stopped smiling. For over ninety minutes he danced, jumped, and ran across the amphitheater stage, never staying in one place too long. An enormous video wall and steel staircase took up the center of the stage, and as the dancers would emerge from atop this staircase and descend onto the stage, Pitbull would ascend the stairs to the platform on top where he could get a bird’s eye view of the sizable crowd. During several songs, he would sing duets with singers on the video wall. Christina Aguilera appeared for “Feel This Moment”, Ke$ha for “Timber”, and Jennifer Lopez for “On the Floor.” Cryo jets sent pillars of fog high into the air, adding an interesting effect when paired with the next level lighting production. During “Fireball” the pyro effects were set off toward the back of the stage, but could be felt in the front row." Will Loschiavo of "Out In Jersey" commented on Iggy Azaleas set stating "Iggy Azalea’s opening act lasts for approximately fifty minutes and consists of a 14-track setlist. Iggy’s vocals are on point, radiating old-school R&B vibes, and her choreography is solid. Standouts include “Team” and “Black Widow,” which are performed within the first 15 minutes, so make sure to arrive on time, if not early. “Kream,” Pretty Girls,” and an epic finale with “Fancy,” one of the biggest songs of the last decade, highlight the second half of the setlist. All in all, Iggy Azalea is the perfect opening act to get the party started in anticipation of Mr. 305."

Tour Dates

Setlist
The following setlists were obtained from Setlist.fm

References

2021 concert tours
Iggy Azalea concert tours
Pitbull (rapper) concert tours